The Bundesstraße 55 (abbr. B 55) is a Bundesstraße road in Germany, connecting Jülich with Rheda-Wiedenbrück via Cologne, Gummersbach, Olpe and Meschede.

See also
List of federal highways in Germany

055
Roads in North Rhine-Westphalia